Markus Lösch (born 26 September 1971, in Stuttgart) is a retired German football player. He made his debut on the professional league level in the 2. Bundesliga for Stuttgarter Kickers on 14 September 1996 when he came on as a half-time substitute in a game against SV Waldhof Mannheim.

References

1971 births
Living people
German footballers
Stuttgarter Kickers players
1. FC Nürnberg players
Eintracht Frankfurt players
SV Eintracht Trier 05 players
Fortuna Düsseldorf players
SSV Ulm 1846 players
Bundesliga players
2. Bundesliga players
Association football midfielders
Footballers from Stuttgart